Borislav Mikić (born 20 December 1975) is a Bosnian footballer who is playing as a midfielder for FSA Prijedor.

Club career
After spending almost a decade in the youth academy of Dinamo Zagreb, Mikić was forced to leave Croatia due to the Yugoslav Wars and return with his family to his hometown of Prijedor. He spent some time playing for Rudar Ljubija, before moving to Serbia and settling in the town of Petrovac na Mlavi. Over the following years, Mikić played for Sloga Petrovac, Sartid Smederevo, Železničar Smederevo, Železničar Lajkovac, Borac Čačak, and Remont Čačak. He eventually made a name for himself at Železnik, helping the club win the Serbia and Montenegro Cup in 2005.

In early 2008, Mikić returned to his birth country and joined Laktaši. He spent two and a half seasons with the club, but left following relegation from the top flight. In June 2010, Mikić signed with Borac Banja Luka, helping them win the national championship for the first time in history. He rejoined Rudar Prijedor in early 2012.

Career statistics

Honours
Železnik
 Serbia and Montenegro Cup: 2004–05
Borac Banja Luka
 Premier League of Bosnia and Herzegovina: 2010–11

References

External links
 
 
 
 

1975 births
Living people
People from Prijedor
Bosnia and Herzegovina emigrants to Serbia
Serbs of Bosnia and Herzegovina
Association football midfielders
Bosnia and Herzegovina footballers
FK Smederevo players
FK Železničar Lajkovac players
FK Borac Čačak players
FK Remont Čačak players
FK Železnik players
FK Voždovac players
Diyarbakırspor footballers
FK Banat Zrenjanin players
FK Laktaši players
FK Borac Banja Luka players
FK Rudar Prijedor players
First League of Serbia and Montenegro players
Premier League of Bosnia and Herzegovina players
First League of the Federation of Bosnia and Herzegovina players
First League of the Republika Srpska players
Süper Lig players
Serbian SuperLiga players
Bosnia and Herzegovina expatriate footballers
Expatriate footballers in Serbia and Montenegro
Bosnia and Herzegovina expatriate sportspeople in Serbia and Montenegro
Expatriate footballers in Turkey
Bosnia and Herzegovina expatriate sportspeople in Turkey
Expatriate footballers in Serbia
Bosnia and Herzegovina expatriate sportspeople in Serbia